Ambri, Inc. is an American startup company which aims to produce molten-salt batteries for energy storage in wind and solar power systems. In 2016 it had thirty-seven employees.

History 

The Liquid Metal Battery Corporation was formed in 2010 to commercialize the liquid-metal battery technology invented by Professor Donald Sadoway and Dr. David Bradwell at the Massachusetts Institute of Technology. It was renamed Ambri in 2012. In 2012 and 2014, it received $40 million in funding from Bill Gates, Khosla Ventures, Total S.A., and GVB.

In September 2015 the company deferred plans for commercial sales of its batteries, and laid off a quarter of its workforce. In 2016 it hoped to develop a calcium-antimony battery.

In 2020, Ambri signed a contract with TerraScale to deliver a 250 MWh energy storage installation for a data center to be built in Churchill County, Nevada near Fernley.

In 2021, Reliance Industries announced that one of its subsidiaries along with Bill Gates and others, would invest $144 million in Ambri. Reliance is also in talks with Ambri to set up manufacturing and distribution facility in India.

See also
  Liquid Metal Batteries

References 

2010 establishments in Massachusetts
American companies established in 2010
Electronics companies of the United States
Technology companies based in Massachusetts
Privately held companies based in Massachusetts
Battery manufacturers
Energy companies established in 2010
Marlborough, Massachusetts